Upper Ngau Tau Kok Estate is a public housing estate in Ngau Tau Kok, Kwun Tong, Kowloon, Hong Kong, located next to Kwun Tong Garden Estate and between MTR Ngau Tau Kok station and Kowloon Bay station. After redevelopment, the estate has 9 blocks developed into 3 phases.

Background
The whole Ngau Tau Kok Estate was separated into Upper Ngau Tau Kok Estate and Lower Ngau Tau Kok Estate, developed in late 1960s. Upper Estate was a low cost housing estate with totally 9 blocks, while Lower Estate was a resettlement estate with totally 14 blocks.

Upper Ngau Tau Kok Estate started its Phase 1 redevelopment in 1998, in which 3 new blocks were constructed in 2003 to offer totally 2,133 units. Phases 2 & 3, which demolished Blocks 1-5 in 2003 and reconstruction started in 2005 and has 6 blocks with totally 4,584 units, were built in 2009. Most of the residents are those affected by the redevelopment of Lower Ngau Tau Kok Estate.

Houses

Education
Upper Ngau Tau Kok Estate is in Primary One Admission (POA) School Net 48. Within the school net are multiple aided schools (operated independently but funded with government money) and Kwun Tong Government Primary School.

See also
Lower Ngau Tau Kok Estate

References

Ngau Tau Kok
Public housing estates in Hong Kong
Residential buildings completed in 2003
Residential buildings completed in 2009